Oak Island is an unincorporated community and census-designated place (CDP) in Chambers County, Texas, United States. The population was 371 at the 2020 census.

Geography
Oak Island is located on the eastern shore of Trinity Bay near the geographic center of Chambers County.

Demographics 

As of the 2020 United States census, there were 371 people, 135 households, and 126 families residing in the CDP.

Hurricane Ike

On September 13, 2008, Hurricane Ike rendered about 90% of the community's homes uninhabitable.

Education
Anahuac Independent School District operates schools in the area.

Notes

References

External links
Chambers County, Texas website

Census-designated places in Chambers County, Texas
Census-designated places in Texas
Greater Houston